Patrick Hopkins (born December 18, 1987) is an American soccer player who last played for the San Francisco Deltas in the North American Soccer League.

Career
Hopkins played college football for DePaul University from 2006 to 2010. In 2011, Hopkins played for Australia's Brisbane Wolves where he scored 17 goals as a midfielder.

In January 2012, Hopkins signed a two-year contract with Swedish side Ljungskile SK. He was appointed team captain for the 2013 season.

In November 2013, Hopkins transferred to IK Sirius where he signed a three-year contract.

In February 2017, Hopkins signed for new expansion team San Francisco Deltas.

References

External links
 Player's Profile at San Francisco Deltas
 

1987 births
Living people
DePaul Blue Demons men's soccer players
San Francisco Deltas players
Soccer players from Illinois
American soccer players
Ljungskile SK players
IK Sirius Fotboll players
Superettan players
North American Soccer League players
Association football defenders